A esmorga is a novel by Galician writer Eduardo Blanco Amor from 1959. It tells about a 24-hour drinking spree of a man called Cibrán and his two friends in a town called Auria, very similar to real life town Ourense. Cibrán tells his story to the police, trying to show himself in the best possible light. The day contains celebrations, fire and a visit to a brothel.

The book has been filmed twice: in 1977 by Gonzalo Suárez under name of Parranda, and in 2014 by  Ignacio Vilar as A esmorga.

References 

20th-century Spanish novels
Galician literature
1959 novels